Perinthalmanna is a major town and municipality in Malappuram district, Kerala, India. It serves as the headquarters of the Perinthalmanna Taluk, and a block and a Revenue Division by the same name. It was formerly the headquarters of Valluvanad Taluk, which was one of the two Taluks in the Malappuram Revenue Division of the erstwhile Malabar District during the British Raj.

It is one of the major commercial centers in the Malappuram district but is not a part of the Malappuram metropolitan area.

The town is home to several medical institutions and one of the three branches of Aligarh Muslim University in India, which is popularly known as AMU Malappuram Campus.

History

Perinthalmanna and the neighbouring town of Angadipuram served as the capital of the Valluvanad Swaroopam dynasty. Valluvanad was ruled by a Samanthan Nair clan known as Vellodis, similar to the Eradis of neighbouring Eranad and the Nedungadis of Nedunganad. The rulers of Valluvanad were known by the title Valluvakonathiri or Vellattiri.

According to local legends, the last Cheraman Perumal ruler gave a vast expanse of land in South Malabar to one of the Valluvakonathiri before going on pilgrimage to Mecca. Valluvanad was famous for the Mamankam festivals (held once every 12 years) and chronic wars against the Zamorin of Calicut.

During the last decades of the eighteenth century, the region came under the control of the vast Kingdom of Mysore. The town served as the headquarters of the Valluvanad Taluk in the erstwhile Malabar District during the British Raj. Perinthalmanna, along with the towns of Malappuram, Manjeri, and Tirurangadi, was one of the main centres of the Malabar Rebellion of 1921. Now it is one of the important commercial centre in Malappuram district.

Poonthanam Nambudiri, a prominent 16th century Malayalam poet and the author of Jnanappana, and E. M. S. Namboodiripad, the first Chief Minister of Kerala, were born in Perinthalmanna.

Geography

Thuthapuzha, a tributary of Bharathappuzha (Ponnani River), which is also the longest river of Kerala, passes through Perinthalmanna. The Western Ghats mountain range begins east of Perinthalmanna. Kodikuthimala hillstation is located in the Thazhekode village of Perinthalmanna Taluk, which also shares its boundary with the municipality of Perinthalmanna. Melattur village of Perinthalmanna Taluk is a part of Nilgiri Biosphere Reserve.

Gulmohar flowering trees are widely seen in the Perinthalmanna area.

Geostatistics
Perinthalmanna became a Grama Panchayat in 1933 under the Malabar District board. The town was later upgraded to a municipality on 10 February 1990.

Perinthalmanna serves as the headquarters of one of the two revenue divisions in Malappuram district, having jurisdiction over Perinthalmanna, Eranad, and Nilambur taluks.

Civic administration
{ "type": "ExternalData", "service": "geoshape", "ids": "Q13113443"}
The town is administered by the Perinthalmanna Municipality, headed by a chairperson. For administrative purposes, the municipality is divided into 34 wards, from each of which members of the municipal council are elected for five years. These wards are:

Perinthalmanna Municipality election 2020

Law and order
The municipality comes under the jurisdiction of the Perinthalmanna Police Station, which was formed on 1 September 1988. The station has the jurisdiction over the villages of Perinthalmanna, Pathaikara, Angadipuram, Elamkulam, Aliparamba, Anamangad, Arakkuparamba, Thazhekode, and parts of Pulamantol and Valambur.

The border police stations are headquartered at Kolathur, Mankada, Melattur, Pattambi, and Nattukal.

Perinthalmanna is also the headquarters for one of the six subdivisions of Malappuram District Police. The police stations at Perinthalmanna, Kolathur, Mankada, Melattur, Pandikkad, and Karuvarakundu come under jurisdiction of Perinthalmanna subdivision of district police. Perinthalmanna Traffic Enforcement Unit also comes under the Subdivision.

Jurisdictional courts of Perinthalmanna Police Station 
 Judicial First Class Magistrate Court - I, Perinthalmanna
 Munsif Magistrate Court, Perinthalmanna
 Fast Track Special Court, Perinthalmanna

Demographics

The population of Perinthalmanna was 49,723 as of the 2011 census. Males constituted 47.3% and females 52.7%. Malayalam is the most spoken language in the town. Perinthalmanna has been a multi-ethnic and multi-religious town since the early medieval period. Muslims form the largest religious group, followed by Hindus and Christians. The municipality of Perinthalmanna has an average literacy rate of 95.3%, which is higher than the state average of 94.0%.

Notable people
Poonthanam – author of the poem Njanappana
E.M.S. Namboodiripad – first Chief Minister of Kerala, born in Elamkulam
Vazhenkada Kunchu Nair
Neralattu Rama Poduval 
Nalakath Soopy – MLA for 26 years from 1980 to 2006 and former Minister for Education
Cherukadu Govinda Pisharody – notable Marxist writer born at Eravimangalam
Rajeev Nair – writer, lyricist, and producer
 Ravi Menon – actor
Manjalamkuzhi Ali – the current MLA from the constituency
 K. P. A. Majeed – former Chief Whip of the Government of Kerala
 Melattur Sahadevan – Carnatic music vocalist
P. Sreeramakrishnan – former Speaker of the Kerala Legislature
M. P. M. Menon – diplomat
Paloli Mohammed Kutty – politician and social worker
 V. Sasikumar – politician and union leader
 Sooraj Thelakkad – actor
 Vinay Govind – film director
 Vazhenkada Vijayan – retired principal of Kerala Kalamandalam
 Mankada Ravi Varma – cinematographer and director
 Mersheena Neenu – actress

Transportation

Road

Perinthalmanna is situated at the centre of Kozhikode–Malappuram–Palakkad National Highway 966. Additional notable roads in Perinthalmanna include:

 Pattambi Road, Cherpulassery Road, Valanchery Road, Nilambur Road, Kozhikode Road, Palakkad Road, and Ooty Road
 Shornur–Perinthalmanna State Highway 23 – ends by joining National Highway 966 at Perinthalmanna
 Perumbilavu–Nilambur State Highway 39
 State Highway 53 – connects Palakkad to Perinthalmanna via Cherpulassery
 Valanchery–Nilambur State Highway 73

The town is facilitated by a KSRTC Sub Depot, and three private bus stands.

Rail

Trains are available from here to Nilambur, Shornur, Palakkad, Kottayam, and Kochuveli.

Air
The nearest airport to Perintalmanna is Karipur Airport,  from Kondotty.

Perinthalmanna Block
Perinthalmanna Block Panchayat is the local body responsible for the block-level administration of the following Gram panchayats:
 Aliparamba
 Angadipuram
 Elamkulam
 Keezhattur
 Melattur
 Pulamantol
 Thazhekode
 Vettathur

See also 
 Angadipuram Laterite
 Education in Perinthalmanna
 Kingdom of Valluvanad
 Nilambur - Shoranur Railway Line
 Pacheeripara
 Perinthalmanna (State Assembly constituency)
 Perinthalmanna Taluk
 Thirumandhamkunnu Temple

References

External links 
 Official website

 
Cities and towns in Malappuram district